Injil (alternative spellings: Ingil or Injeel) is the Arabic name for the Gospel of Jesus (Isa). This Injil is described by the Quran as one of the four Islamic holy books which was revealed by God, the others being the Zabur (possibly the Psalms), the Tawrat (the Torah), and the Quran itself.  The word Injil is also used in the Quran, the Hadith and early Muslim documents to refer to both a book and revelations made by God to Jesus.

Etymology
The Arabic word Injil (إنجيل) as found in Islamic texts, and now used also by Muslim non-Arabs and Arab non-Muslims, is derived from the Syriac Aramaic word awongaleeyoon (ܐܘܢܓܠܝܘܢ) found in the  Peshitta (Syriac translation of the Bible), which in turn derives from the Greek word euangelion of the originally Greek language New Testament, where it means "good news" (from Greek "Εὐ αγγέλιον"; Old English "gōdspel"; Modern English "gospel", or "evangel" as an archaism, cf. e.g. Spanish "evangelio") The word Injil occurs twelve times in the Quran.

Identification
Muslim scholars have resisted identifying the Injil with the New Testament Gospels. Some have suggested the Injil may be the Gospel of Barnabas or Gospel of Thomas.  More commonly, Muslim scholars have argued that the Injil refers to a text now lost or hopelessly corrupted.  For example, Abdullah Yusuf Ali wrote:

Several verses in the Quran have been understood by some non-Muslim scholars to be problematic to this view, such as:

While Muslim scholars interpret this verse as God warning the Christians not to enforce the law contrary to the law sent by God, other scholars see it as affirming the preservation of the New Testament Gospels:

Gabriel Said Reynolds also argued in his research that several words used in the verses that indicate distortion were meant for interpretation of the Gospel, instead of alteration.

Nature

Regardless of scholarly disagreement, Muslims commonly believe that Injil refers to a true Gospel, bestowed upon Jesus by God. Many Muslims believe that the Injil was revealed by God to Jesus in a manner comparable to the way the Quran was revealed to Muhammad; as presumed from passages in the Quran stating the gospel was a received message, such as (tr. Pickthall):

Muslims reject the view that Jesus or any other person wrote the Injil, instead crediting its authorship to God. Many Muslim scholars continue to believe that the Biblical Gospel has undergone alteration, that the words and the meaning of the words have been distorted, with some passages suppressed and others added. A key Islamic principle of oneness (Tawhid) and wholeness of God's divinity means that in their view it is impossible for Jesus to be God incarnate or the Son of God, and claims to the contrary within the Biblical Gospels must be due to later additions. Nevertheless, the Bible has been used by Muslims as a historical source. It is said in the Quran (interpretation of the meaning):

According to a hadith collected by al-Bukhari:

See also
 Biblical and Quranic narratives
 Christianity and Islam
 Islamic holy books
 Islamic view of the Christian Bible
 List of Christian terms in Arabic
 Scrolls of Abraham

References

External links
 A discussion of the Injil and some other scriptures

Islamic texts
Christianity and Islam
Bible